Callogaeana is a genus of Asian cicadas in the tribe Gaeanini.  This genus includes species that were previously placed in Gaeana and sometimes known as known as "butterfly cicadas" due to their colourful wings.

Species
The Catalogue of Life lists nine living species:
 Callogaeana annamensis (Distant, 1913)
 Callogaeana aurantiaca Chou & Yao, 1985
 Callogaeana festiva (Fabricius, 1803) - synonym Gaeana festiva
 Callogaeana guangxiensis Chou & Yao, 1985
 Callogaeana hageni (Distant, 1889)
 Callogaeana jinghongensis Chou & Yao, 1985
 Callogaeana sultana (Distant, 1913)
 Callogaeana viridula Chou & Yao, 1985 - type species
 Callogaeana vitalisi (Distant, 1913)

References

External links 

Images of C. festiva on Cicada mania

Cicadas
Gaeanini
Hemiptera of Asia
Hemiptera genera